Ekkehard Fasser (3 September 1952 – 8 April 2021) was a Swiss bobsledder who competed in the 1980s. He won a gold medal in the four-man event with teammates Kurt Meier, Marcel Fässler, and Werner Stocker at the 1988 Winter Olympics in Calgary.

Fasser also earned a gold medal in the four-man event at the 1983 FIBT World Championships in Lake Placid, New York.

He was Bobsleigh World Cup champion overall in 1985-6 and unofficially in four-man that same year. Fasser died on April 8, 2021.

References

 Bobsleigh four-man Olympic medalists for 1924, 1932-56, and since 1964
 Bobsleigh four-man world championship medalists since 1930
 
 List of combined men's bobsleigh World Cup champions: 1985-2007
 List of four-man bobsleigh World Cup champions since 1985

External links
 
 

1952 births
Bobsledders at the 1984 Winter Olympics
Bobsledders at the 1988 Winter Olympics
2021 deaths
Olympic bobsledders of Switzerland
Olympic gold medalists for Switzerland
Swiss male bobsledders
Olympic medalists in bobsleigh
Medalists at the 1988 Winter Olympics
20th-century Swiss people